At the Dolphin Bay is a Taiwanese drama that stars Angela Chang, Ambrose Hsu, Wallace Huo, Jill Hsu and Penny Lin. The drama aired in 2003 on SETTV.

Plot
Legend has it a dolphin once helped to reunite a pair of tragic lovers. From then on, the well-adored animal became the guardian of love. At Dolphin Bay, a tale of love and myth continues.

Two children, Zerya and Xiao Pin Gai, met at an orphanage. Seeing the latter was often bullied by the other kids, Zerya rose to the occasion to become her gallant protector. Alas, the young couple parted ways when the director of a big company Hsu Ruogu arrived to bring his ‘grandson’ home. Zerya promised to come back for Xiao Pin Gai but as he was returning a few days later, Xiao Pin Gai was already leaving the orphanage with her new adoptive mother. He returns again 20 years later to fulfill his promise, but his childhood friend is nowhere to be found.

At Dolphin Bay, Zerya meets a young woman Tianbian. Her strong and optimistic character draws him to her, and Tianbian is touched by all that Zerya does for her. Tianbian actually is Xiao Pin Gai, Zerya's good friend back at the orphanage. Just like Zerya, Tianbian was adopted by her current mother. Zerya who was adopted by the Hsu family is currently an important leader in the company, SET. He lived with his grandfather, his step-mother and his half-sister, Shan-Ni.

While Zerya lived in a well-to-do family, Tianbian and her mother were frequently harassed by a loan shark to pay back the money they borrowed from them. Touched by Tianbian's determination Zerya helped Tianbian to attend singing audition to select new talent in SET. Upon listening to Tianbian's singing, the music director Hsiao Kang instantly liked her voice and decided she will be SET's new voice for SkyWalk project, much to the dismay of SET's current singer, Mandy Chen. Being Hsiao Kang's lover during their working period, she viewed TianBian as a rival and vowed to challenge her.

While working together, attraction blossoms between Zerya and Tianbian. However, Zerya soon found out that Tianbian was the real child his grandfather was looking for in the orphanage. Realizing that he had robbed Tianbian the opportunity of having the life he shouldn't, Zerya made a deal with the grandfather to marry Shan-Ni in return of acknowledging TianBian as his granddaughter. The situation was further complicated when Hsiao Kang fell for TianBian and Mandy became unreasonably jealous of this relationship. When Shan-Ni agreed to a fake marriage with Zerya, she actually fell in love with him and asked him to love her instead. As Zerya realized he could only love Tianbian, they found out Shan-Ni suffered from leukemia and had less than a year to live. He finally agreed to marry Shan-Ni out of pity while Tianbian decided to try loving Hsiao Kang who had helped her a lot.

Meanwhile, Skywalk project ran into a dead end when Mandy decided to use all resources and her promotion to deprive Skywalk from being covered by media and public. Tianbian's single slumped in the market and was scoring low for the season. Hsiao Kang did not give up and tried his best to support Tianbian out of his love to her to the extent that he mortgaged his house to finance the album promotion. Luck turned to their sides when two foreigners who watched their performance in the street were actually two executives of internationally renowned perfume looking for brand ambassador in Taiwan. Tianbian was signed up for the advertisement and soon, her album picked up the market.

The fact that they looked like Tianbian and Zerya had decided to live separate lives improved Tianbian's relationship with Hsu family. She even grew closer to Shan-Ni and really took her as an elder sister. Realizing that Tianbian was also his granddaughter, the grandfather grew warmer and acknowledged her fully. They even came as a family to support Tianbian's concert. In this concert, Hsiao Kang finally realized he did not want to lose Mandy and they rekindled their romance. During the concert, Shan-Ni collapsed and was in critical condition. She finally died in Zerya's arms after asking him to find happiness.

A few years later, Zerya was seen as the top leader in SET interviewed by a foreign journalist. Tianbian was coming back after a world concert. She visited the old orphanage where she met Zerya for the first time. She received a purple shell sent by Hsiao Kang to the orphanage. Apparently, Zerya received another purple shell and was heading to the orphanage at the same time. As she is walking away, they pass each other. Although Zerya does not see her, he realizes it and asks for the car to stop. When he calls out to her with the name Xiao Pin Gai, TianBian turns around and runs into his arms. They hug and then share a kiss.

Cast
Angela Chang as Yi Tian Bian
Ambrose Hsu as Xu Ze Ya
Wallace Huo as Zhong Xiao Gang
Jill Hsu as Chen Man Qing
Penny Lin as Xu Shan Ni
Liang Xiu Shen as Xu Ruo Gu
Ge Wei Ru as Xiang Li Hong
Linda Liu as Li Hui Lan
Deric Wan as Eddy
Chen Yi Rong

Remake
It was remade in Indonesia as Kau Masih Kekasihku, starring Asmirandah as Aulia (Yi Tian Bian), Arifin Putra as Kevin (Zhong Xiao Gang), and Baim Wong as Axel (Xu Ze Ya).

References

Chinese Television System original programming
Sanlih E-Television original programming
2003 Taiwanese television series debuts
2003 Taiwanese television series endings
Television shows set in Taiwan